Shelah may refer to:

 Shelah (son of Judah), a son of Judah according to the Bible
 Shelah (name), a Hebrew personal name
 Shlach, the 37th weekly Torah portion (parshah) in the annual Jewish cycle of Torah reading
 Salih, a prophet described in the Qur'an whom some scholars believe to be the Islamic counterpart of Shelah son of Judah
 Salah, sometimes referred to by the name "Shelah", a minor Biblical figure (son of Arpachshad, father of Eber)
 Pool of Siloam, also referred to as the "pool of Shelah", a site of Biblical significance in Jerusalem
 Shenei Luhot HaBerit, Hebrew initialed "Shelah", 16th-century Rabbi Isaiah Horowitz most influential work
 Ofer Shelah (born 1960), Israeli politician
 Saharon Shelah (born 1945), a contemporary mathematician working in set theory and logic
 Original name of Shadmot Mehola, a West Bank Israeli settlement

See also

 Shela (disambiguation) 
 Shelagh
 Sela (disambiguation)